Hoseynabad-e Shafi Pur (also Romanized as Ḩoseynābād–e Shafī‘ Pūr; also known as Ḩoseynābād and ’oseynābād) is a village in Garizat Rural District, Nir District, Taft County, Yazd Province, Iran. At the 2006 census, its population was 260, in 70 families.

References 

Populated places in Taft County